Elizabeth Galphin (born August 26, 1968) is an American former professional tennis player.

Galphin, ranked as high as 185 in the world, had a third round appearance at the 1987 Argentine Open, beating seeded player Christiane Jolissaint en route. She featured in the singles main draw of the 1988 Australian Open and won her first round match against Paula Smith. Her son Milledge Cossu is a tennis player, currently for Purdue University.

ITF finals

Singles: 2 (0–2)

Doubles: 1 (0–1)

References

External links
 
 

1968 births
Living people
American female tennis players